Wine TV or Wine Network was a digital cable & satellite television channel that aired programming about Wine and Spirits.  It was the only such channel in the world, featuring programming dedicated to wine lovers including shows about wine making, wine growing, wine selection, cooking with wine and many others.  It also focused on wine culture with topics such as cigars, travel, fashion, entertainment and art & culture.

Wine TV launched on September 17, 2004 and is independently owned and operated.  At launch, it was unable to secure a carriage deal with any provider in the United States, so the decision was made to launch the channel internationally where it has been quite successful.  Wine TV secured distribution in 22 countries, 4 continents. Wine TV was also available in Germany, where it was known as Wein TV, on Kabel Deutschland, ish TV (cable) & Primacom (IPTV). The German version ceased broadcasting in late January 2009. Wine TV which was also available in the UK and Ireland on the Sky Digital platform, where it went by the name Wine TV however that also ceased broadcasting in late January. In the Philippines, the channel was available in SkyCable. In Australia, Selectv offered this channel until September 8, 2008.

Programming

Wine TV features a wide array of programming covering many different aspects of Wine culture and the wine industry.  Among the programs aired on Wine TV include:

The Wine Route - A series exploring various acclaimed Wine regions around  the world

Wine 101 - A program designed to educate viewers on world of wine, with trips to various wine regions in France, Germany, Italy, Portugal & the United States

A Taste Of Brittany - A cooking show that gives viewers a look at the wine and cuisine of Brittany region in France

Off the Vine - A behind-the-scenes look at the Australian wine industry

Wine Television - A lifestyle program that combines stories about wine with tales of travel and good food

References 

Television networks in the United States
Television channels and stations established in 2004
Television channels and stations disestablished in 2009
Television channels and networks about wine
Defunct television channels in Australia